This is a list of programs broadcast by the NTA Film Network, an early American television network and syndication service which operated in North America from 1956 to around 1961, when the network's flagship station, WNTA-TV, was sold.

All programs are listed below, whether they were NTA original series or programs only seen in second-run syndication.

References

NTA Film Network